Susen Küster (born 27 July 1994) is a German hammer thrower. She competed in the women's hammer throw at the 2017 World Championships in Athletics.

References

External links

1994 births
Living people
German female hammer throwers
World Athletics Championships athletes for Germany
Place of birth missing (living people)